Rhinella achalensis is a species of toad in the family Bufonidae that is endemic to northern Argentina (Córdoba and San Luis provinces).

Its natural habitats are rocky outcrops in montane grasslands where it reproduces in mountain streams. Juveniles and adults seem to avoid heavily grazed areas, using instead rocky outcrops that offer more protection.

Rhinella achalensis is threatened by cattle ranching and pollution of water by cattle.

References

achalensis
Amphibians of Argentina
Endemic fauna of Argentina
Amphibians described in 1972
Taxonomy articles created by Polbot